Michael Lucas (born Andrei Lvovich Treivas, March 10, 1972) is a Russian-born American–Israeli businessman and the founder and CEO of Lucas Entertainment, Manhattan's largest gay-adult-film company.

The New Republic dubbed Lucas "Gay Porn's Neocon Kingpin". He contends that his film Michael Lucas' La Dolce Vita is the most expensive gay porn film ever made, with a budget of $250,000 and multiple celebrity cameos. In 2009, Lucas was inducted into the GayVN Hall of Fame, noted for "his stature as an A-list director and performer". He was included in a 2009 New York magazine feature about people who made it to the top, despite arriving in the city with very little.

Lucas is particularly well known for his activism and outspokenness. His criticism of drug use and his sponsorship of public service ad campaigns about the dangers of unprotected sex in the gay community led Harvey Fierstein to interview him for The Advocate. His New York Blade columns on Ultra-Orthodox Judaism and Islam sparked a campus debate at Stanford University in February 2008 when Lucas was invited to give a speech to students. In 2010 he debated Peter Tatchell and Sue Sanders at England's Oxford University on whether the gay rights movement has undermined family values.

In 2009, Lucas released the film Men of Israel, which he called his most important. Journalists from The Atlantic, Out Magazine and Yediot Aharonot noted it as a landmark film as the first pornographic movie shot on location with an all-Israeli cast; while Tablet Magazine and the Los Angeles Times remarked on it being the first to feature an all-Jewish cast. Lucas followed the film with a gay tour of Israel. New York's LGBT Center stopped allowing groups associated with the Israeli-Palestinian conflict to meet in their building after Lucas led a protest over their allowance of an anti-occupation group.

In recent years Lucas has also begun work as a documentarian. In 2012, he released his first documentary film about the thriving Israeli LGBT community. Titled Undressing Israel: Gay Men in the Promised Land, the film includes footage of Tel Aviv's vibrant nightlife, a same-sex wedding, and candid interviews with a diverse range of local Israeli gays and lesbians, including a gay MP, an openly gay Army trainer, a drag queen, a transvestite, a young Arab-Israeli journalist, and same-sex parents raising their children and a number of artists and activists. In 2014 Lucas released his second documentary, Campaign of Hate: Russia and Gay Propaganda, which investigates the current anti-gay climate in Russian politics and society.

Background 
Lucas was born on March 10, 1972, in Moscow, Russia, to Lev Bregman, an engineer, and Elena Treivas, a Russian literature teacher. He was raised in a secular Jewish family. In 1994 he obtained a degree in law from the Kutafin Moscow State Law University. After graduation, Lucas briefly owned and operated a travel agency in Russia until 1995.

In 1995, Lucas left for Munich, Germany, on a tourist visa. Without an official work permit, he worked and starred in heterosexual porn. He then worked as a nude model and in gay porn for French adult film producer Jean-Daniel Cadinot in Paris.

Lucas moved to New York City in 1997, where he worked at the Gaiety Theater. After a few adult industry jobs in California, he was offered a one-year contract by Falcon Entertainment whose producers had seen him in a French Cadinot film. Lucas won a U.S. green card through the lottery system. With money saved from his work at Falcon, Lucas founded his own gay porn company in New York, rather than Los Angeles where most American porn companies are headquartered, in 1998.

In 2001, Lucas brought his Russian family to the United States. On November 12, 2004, Lucas was sworn in as an American citizen. In October 2008 it was announced that Lucas had married his boyfriend of eight years, Richard Winger. A press release stated that the couple wanted to marry to make a statement about same-sex marriage rights. In 2014 Lucas announced he and Winger divorced.

Career

Actor 
Lucas began his career in a German heterosexual pornographic film. While in France, he worked under the influential French director Jean-Daniel Cadinot, appearing as "Ramzes Kairoff" in two gay pornographic films, both released in 1996. Using the name "Michel Lucas," he worked as a Falcon Exclusive, performing as a top in five films released in 1997 and 1998.

Director 
He directed his first project, Back in the Saddle, in 1998, and also performed in the film. With co-director Tony DiMarco, Lucas won Best Director at the 2007 GayVN Awards for Michael Lucas' La Dolce Vita. DiMarco and Lucas also won a 2008 XBIZ Award for Best GLBT Director, and Lucas received an award for Best Publicity Stunt for "Michael Lucas Found Dead".

The Banana Guide called his productions the most polished, big-budget gay porn films ever made and cited Lucas' love for the subject and high technical aptitude.

Since the founding of Lucas Entertainment, Lucas has gone on to direct over 400 adult films for his studio.

Lucas Entertainment 

In 1998, Lucas founded his own production company, Lucas Entertainment. He based the company in New York City (rather than Los Angeles, where many of the other pornography studios are located in part because of the city's hospitable environment for adult films.) In 2004, Lucas Distribution, Inc., his adult video distribution company, began operations. Lucas directs, produces and stars in his own films under the Lucas Entertainment banner. His studio has garnered many GayVN Awards and Adult Erotic Gay Video Awards ("Grabbys") nominations and wins.

In the summer of 2005 Lucas released Michael Lucas' Dangerous Liaisons; the film featured celebrity cameos from RuPaul, Boy George, Graham Norton, Bruce Vilanch, Lady Bunny, Amanda Lepore, and Michael Musto.

The company received 24 nominations for the 2009 GayVN Awards, including best picture for Return to Fire Island. That May, Lucas filmed the first gay porn film using all Israeli models, billing it as a sexual journey to promote Israeli culture. The company launched its Men of Israel website to promote the film, which announced its release for July 22.

Michael Lucas' La Dolce Vita 

In 2006, the studio released Michael Lucas' La Dolce Vita Parts 1 & 2, a gay pornographic remake of the 1960 Fellini classic La Dolce Vita. The film won a record fourteen awards at the 2007 GayVN Awards, winning in every category in which it was nominated.

In February 2007, International Media Films, Inc., which owns the rights to Fellini's La Dolce Vita, filed suit against Lucas (as Andrei Treivas Bregman), Lucas Entertainment, Inc., and Lucas Distribution, Inc. for trademark and copyright infringement. The lawsuit seeks to collect unspecified damages and to stop sales of Michael Lucas' La Dolce Vita Parts 1 & 2.

Lucas won the lawsuit in April 2010 in a summary judgment by Judge John George Koeltl, who dismissed IMF's claims of copyright infringement, since many porn films have parodied mainstream films.

Writer, speaker and activist 

In the 2000s, Lucas attracted attention for his views on politics and culture through a series of columns, speaking events and his increasing activism. He is a vocal opponent of drug use and an advocate for safe sex, both in the porn industry and the gay community at large. In August 2004, The Advocate published an interview by Harvey Fierstein with Lucas about his full-page public service announcements in several national publications warning of the dangers of unprotected sex.

Increasingly Lucas gained attention for his politics, and in particular his views on Israel and Muslims. In March 2008 he was profiled in The New Republic as "Gay porn's neocon kingpin". The article explored his background and a controversy over his writings on Islam that surrounded a lecture he gave at Stanford University.

In an interview with Michael Musto in April 2009, Lucas remarked that his stifled upbringing in Soviet Russia influenced how vocal he is about his opinions.

Lucas wrote about the need for LGBT people to reassess conservatives in August 2010, citing Ann Coulter as an example of a gay-friendly conservative leader.

Columnist 
On April 20, 2007, The New York Blade began to publish regular opinion columns by Lucas, who had previously had a number of comments published in the Blade's opinion section. In October 2009, Lucas wrote a column for The Advocate decrying the group Queers Undermining Israeli Terrorism. In March 2010 Lucas began writing a column for The Advocate. His columns have focused on Israel, Russia's confronting homosexuality, and the Park51 controversy. In 2011 he started writing a column for Huffington Post.

Islam 
His writings on Islam have been controversial. In a 2007 New York Blade column, Lucas expressed support for artist Charles Merrill's burning of a Koran that was estimated at $60,000. He has condemned Islam and accused it of creating negative attitudes that lead to the persecution of homosexuals and discrimination of women.

As a columnist for The Advocate, Lucas continued to explore Islamic topics. In a heavily debated column, he called the Cordoba House, a proposed Islamic community center and mosque controversially located near the World Trade Center site, a 'monument to Muslim terrorism' and an example of "political Islam's ascendancy." After the 2011 Egyptian revolution he wrote that the Muslim Brotherhood would fill a power vacuum, asserting that it would be a problem for the discreet Egyptian gay community that has lived with relatively little government persecution.

University lectures 
In April 2005, Lucas was invited to speak before a Calhoun College Master's Tea at Yale University. The speech was organized with the assistance of gaYalies, a campus group for gay and bisexual men. He spoke about his life history and his views on pornography. In February 2006 he participated in a symposium on adult entertainment that was sponsored by the Yale Journal of Law and Feminism, which later published Lucas' discussion in its Spring issue.

The Speakers Bureau at Stanford University invited Lucas to speak in Cubberley Auditorium on February 14, 2008, about the role the adult entertainment industry plays in AIDS prevention. The appearance sparked debate about his political columns for the New York Blade, particularly his assertions that "the Qur'an is today's Mein Kampf" and that its teachings inspire Muslims to kill gay people.

Lucas, who grew up in the Soviet Union and experienced its antisemitism and Homophobia, was on a panel at The New School on the state of gay rights and acceptability in Eastern Europe.

Activism

Documentarian 

2012 marked another turning point in Lucas' career—he released his first documentary film, "Undressing Israel: Gay Men in the Promised Land." The official film synopsis explains Lucas' mission in creating the film: "When many people think of Israel, it is often in terms of modern war or ancient religion. But there is much more to the Jewish state than missiles and prayers. In his debut as a documentary filmmaker, adult-film entrepreneur and political columnist Michael Lucas examines a side of Israel that is too often overlooked: its thriving gay community. Undressing Israel features interviews with a diverse range of local men, including a gay member of Israel's parliament, a trainer who served openly in the army, a young Arab-Israeli journalist, and a pair of dads raising their kids. Lucas also visits Tel Aviv's vibrant nightlife scene—and even attends a same-sex wedding—in this guided tour of a country that has emerged as a pioneer for gay integration and equality." Lucas released his second documentary, "Campaign of Hate: Russian and Gay Propaganda," in 2014 with co-director and co-producer Scott Stern.

PrEP 
In 2013 Lucas wrote an op-ed column at Out.com where he discussed his use of Truvada (which he began using in June of that year), the medication used as a pre-exposure prophylaxis (PrEP) to prevent contracting the HIV virus. In his column Lucas wrote: "The more I learn about PrEP, the more shocked I'm becoming that gay men are not shouting from the rooftops about this potential game changer in the fight to prevent new HIV infections, which we're losing badly. I'm ready to shout about it. Here's what helped convince me: Dr. Robert Grant of UCSF, the researcher who led the multinational study on PrEP, was quoted at an AIDS conference as saying that 'No one in iPrEx [the PrEP study] acquired HIV infection with a drug level that would have been expected with daily dosing.' Was this really possible? Whether they used condoms or not, people who took Truvada, as prescribed, were protected from the virus?"

Lucas continues to advocate the use and understanding of PrEP in an effort to end the AIDS epidemic. In September 2015 he created his first public-service announcement where he explains the importance of PrEP. In September 2015 he followed up with his original Out.com writing by saying that PrEP works, and the backlash against the medication's use needs to stop. Lucas wrote the following in his column: "Despite all the attempted distractions, the focus must remain on the simple message in the new study: If you take PrEP, you will not get HIV. Period. It is time to wake up, stop the endless debating, and take action. The war against HIV rages on, and when scientists actually win a battle, we must avail ourselves of the powerful weapon they have developed." On February 24, 2016, PrEP was formally approved in Israel.

Israel 

The core of Lucas' worldview is his Jewish identity, and particularly his deep affinity for the state of Israel. His time growing up in the Soviet Union, which was notorious for its antisemitism, meant that like many Russian Jews, Lucas had to repress his identity. Lucas has claimed that he was given his mother's maiden name at birth specifically because Treivas sounded less Jewish than his father's surname Bregman.

Hezbollah's attacks in the 2006 Lebanon war affected Lucas, who in the midst of the fighting announced his plans to go to Israel to entertain gay soldiers (who are allowed to serve openly in the military). Lucas received a positive response to the trip; however, some religious segments of Israeli society had expressed less enthusiasm for the arrival of a gay porn magnate. In an article, "Lucas responds," Lucas characterized some of the reaction as homophobic and in an interview said, "Israel is my country as much as it is yours. To come to Israel is my birthright." In September 2009, Lucas was granted Israeli citizenship. In 2010, he renounced his Russian citizenship.

The next summer in a New York Blade column Lucas brought up his disapproval of Haredi Judaism in Israel once again. In "Trouble With Ultra-Orthodox," Lucas referred to the Ultra-Orthodox community in Jerusalem as "religious goons" and parasites for his belief that they take advantage of state welfare programs.

New York LGBT Community Center
In February 2011, Lucas created a controversy over a pro-Palestinian group that planned to hold a meeting at New York's Lesbian, Gay, Bisexual & Transgender Community Center. The group, Siegebusters, had planned to hold a fundraising party on March 5 at the center to help fund another vessel to break the Israeli naval blockade of Gaza, as well as to train activists. Lucas protested and claimed that Israel is the only gay-friendly country in the Middle East, that the group was anti-Semitic, and that LGBT people in the Palestinian territories are tortured and killed. After Lucas's calls for a boycott, the Center backed down and decided that Siegebusters was not an LGBT-related group, and so they should not use their space for the Israeli Apartheid Week event. Siegebusters protested the decision by organizing an online petition; Lucas told The Jerusalem Post that his success with the event's cancellation was a "landmark moment" in his life.

The controversy arose again in May 2011 after the center agreed to let the group Queers Against Israeli Apartheid meet in their building, triggering Lucas to again call for a boycott and an end to the center's funding. In a statement defending the move, the center said that it "provides space for a variety of LGBT voices in our community to engage in conversations on a range of topics." In a press release, Lucas responded that the center had become an accomplice of an "anti-Semitic hate group whose goal is the destruction of the Jewish state of Israel". In the beginning of June 2011, the center decided to place a "moratorium" on renting space to "groups that organize around the Israeli-Palestinian conflict."

In popular culture 
Lucas appeared in Timothy Greenfield-Sanders' 2004 book XXX: 30 Porn Star Photographs
and the accompanying HBO documentary Thinking XXX.
Greenfield-Sanders asked Lucas for a list of his ten favorite films; the ten films he listed are all films from his own production company. In May 2007, Kensington Books published Naked: The Life and Times of Michael Lucas, a biography of Lucas. Lucas asserts the book was published without his involvement or approval.

Awards 
 2000 Adult Erotic Gay Video Awards ("Grabbys") Best Newcomer—Director
 2001 GayVN Awards Best Solo Performance, Fire Island Cruising
 2007 GayVN Awards Best Actor, Michael Lucas' La Dolce Vita
 2007 GayVN Awards Best Threesome, Michael Lucas' La Dolce Vita
 2007 GayVN Awards Best Director, Michael Lucas' La Dolce Vita (Tony DiMarco, co-director)
 2008 XBIZ Award GLBT Director of the Year (with Tony DiMarco)
 2008 XBIZ Award Publicity Stunt of the Year, Michael Lucas Found Dead
 2009 GayVN Awards GayVN Hall of Fame

Filmography

Adult films 
A complete list of film performance and model credits can be found at Lucas Entertainment.com, including those directed, written or produced by Lucas.

Documentaries 
 2012: Undressing Israel: Gay Men in the Promised Land (written, produced, directed) – co-directed by Yariv Mozer
 2014: Campaign of Hate: Russia and Gay Propaganda – co-directed and produced with Scott Stern

See also 

 Adult Erotic Gay Video Awards
 GayVN Awards
 LGBT culture in New York City
 List of male performers in gay porn films
 List of pornographic movie studios
 List of LGBT people from New York City
 New Yorkers in journalism

References

External links 
 
 
 
 Gay Erotic Video Index

1972 births
American male pornographic film actors
American people of Russian-Jewish descent
American pornographic film directors
American pornographic film producers
American Zionists
American LGBT rights activists
Directors of gay pornographic films
Producers of gay pornographic films
American critics of Islam
21st-century Israeli Jews
Gay Jews
Israeli gay actors
American gay actors
Living people
Russian emigrants to the United States
Russian Zionists
HuffPost writers and columnists
Gay pornographic film actors
American actors in gay pornographic films
Israeli male pornographic film actors